Swami Atmapriyananda is an Indian university administrator and a monk (Sannyasin) of the Ramakrishna Order. He was the first Vice-Chancellor of Ramakrishna Mission Vivekananda University. Swami Atmapriyananda received his Ph.D. in Physics from the University of Madras. He joined the Ramakrishna Math and Ramakrishna Mission in 1978.

References 

Indian academic administrators
University of Madras alumni